Schuyler Lee (Sky) Gilbert Jr. (born December 20, 1952) is a Canadian writer, actor, academic and drag performer. Born in Norwich, Connecticut, he studied theatre at York University in Toronto, Ontario, and at the University of Toronto, before becoming the co-founder and artistic director of Buddies in Bad Times, a Toronto theatre company dedicated to LGBT drama. His drag name is Jane. Gilbert also teaches a course on playwrighting at the University of Guelph.

Although primarily a playwright, Gilbert has also published novels, poetry and an autobiography. His works deal with issues of gender and sexuality. Many of Gilbert's works are produced at Buddies in Bad Times Theatre. He has also been a regular columnist for Toronto's eye weekly.

Gilbert holds the University Chair in Creative Writing and Theatre Studies at the University of Guelph. He received his Ph.D. at the University of Toronto.

Gilbert is artistic director of The Hammertheatre Company, founded in January 2007, a company devoted to theatre research in Hamilton, Ontario. The theatre is at the old Ancient Order of Foresters building in the James Street North neighbourhood, a center of Hamilton's art scene.

Gilbert has been living in Hamilton since 2004 with his partner, artist Ian Jarvis.

Works

Plays
 Art Rat (1980)
 Lana Turner Has Collapsed! (1980)
 Cavafy (1981)
 Murder/Lover (1982)
 Pasolini/Pelosi (1983)
Peace Banquet: Ancient Greece Meets the Atomic Age - co-written with Micah Barnes, Cynthia Grant, Dean Gilmour, Charis Polatos, Kim Renders, Judith Rudakoff, Philip Shepherd, and Maureen White (first performed November 1983)
 The Dressing Gown: a faery tale for adults only (Playwrights Canada Press, 1984)
 The Postman Rings Once: a comedy (Playwrights Canada Press, 1985)
 Theatrelife: a modern melodrama (Playwrights Canada Press, 1987)
 Drag Queens in Outer Space: a dreamplay (Playwrights Canada Press, 1990; Second Scene Editions, 2006)
 Ban This Show: a play in the form of a dare (Playwrights Union of Canada, 1990)
 The whore's revenge : a Victorian melodrama (Playwrights Union of Canada)
 Suzie Goo: Private Secretary (1991; Second Scene Editions, 2006)
 In Which Pier Paolo Pasolini Sees His Own Death in the Face of a Boy (1991)
 My Night With Tennessee (1992)
 An Investigation into the Strange Case of the Wildboy: a dream in the form of a document (Playwrights Union of Canada, 1992)
 Play Murder (Blizzard Publishing, 1993)
 Drag Queens on Trial: a courtroom melodrama (Playwrights Union of Canada, 1994)
 Hester: An Introduction (1994)
 More Divine (1994)
 Jim Dandy (1995)
 Crater (Playwrights Union of Canada, 1997)
 Ten ruminations on an elegy attributed to William Shakespeare (Playwrights Union of Canada, 1997), 
 Schubert Lied (1998)
 Independence (1998)
 The emotionalists (Blizzard, 2000)
 Heliogabalus: A Love Story (Cabaret Theatre Company, 2002)
 Rope Enough (Playwrights Canada Press, Buddies 2005)
 Bad Acting Teachers (Buddies 26 Apr-7 May 2006)
 Will The Real J.T. LeRoy Please Stand up? (to premiere April 2007, Buddies)
 ''I Have AIDS! (Premiered April 22, 2009, Buddies)
 The Situationists (Premiered April 2011, Buddies)
 To Myself at 28 (2013, SummerWorks Theatre Festival)
 A Few Brittle Leaves (Premiered April 24, 2013, Buddies)

Collections 
 This Unknown Flesh: A Collection of Plays by Sky Gilbert (Coach House Press, 1995)
 Painted, tainted, sainted: four plays (Playwrights Canada Press, 1996)
 Avoidance tactics (Broken Jaw Press, 2001)
 Perfectly abnormal: seven gay plays (editor) (Playwrights Canada Press, 2006)

Novels 
 Guilty (Insomniac Press, 1998)
 St. Stephen's (Insomniac Press, 1999)
 I am Kasper Klotz (ECW Press, 2001)
 An English Gentleman (ReLit Award; novel, Cormorant Books, 2004)
 Brother Dumb (novel, ECW Press, 2006)

Poetry & Other 
 Digressions of a Naked Party Girl (poetry, ECW Press, 1998)
 Temptations for a juvenile delinquent (poetry, ECW Press, 2003)
 A Nice Place To Visit (poetry, ECW Press, 2009)
 Ejaculations from the Charm Factory: a memoir (autobiography, ECW Press, 2000)
 Shakespeare Beyond Science: When Poetry Was the World (literary criticism, Guernica Editions, 2020 )

Films 
 Listen to the City (1984)
 Film (1992)
 Kanada (1993)
 My Addiction (1994)
 Bubbles Galore (1996)
 My Summer Vacation (1996)
 The Blue Hermaphrodite (1996)
 No Contest II (1997)
 Too Much Sex (2000)

References

External links
 Sky Gilbert

1952 births
American emigrants to Canada
Canadian literary critics
Canadian columnists
Canadian drag queens
Canadian gay writers
Living people
Canadian LGBT rights activists
Academic staff of the University of Guelph
University of Toronto alumni
Canadian LGBT dramatists and playwrights
Canadian male dramatists and playwrights
Canadian male non-fiction writers
People from Norwich, Connecticut
Writers from Connecticut
Writers from Hamilton, Ontario
LGBT people from Connecticut
Canadian artistic directors
20th-century Canadian dramatists and playwrights
21st-century Canadian dramatists and playwrights
20th-century Canadian male writers
21st-century Canadian male writers
Gay dramatists and playwrights
21st-century Canadian LGBT people
20th-century Canadian LGBT people